Ampatuyoc (Quechua: hamp'atu frog, -yuq a suffix, "the one with a frog (or frogs)", also spelled Hamp'atuyuq, Ccampatuyocc) may refer to the following mountains in Peru:

 Ampatuyoc (Ayacucho)
 Ampatuyoc (Churcampa) 
 Ampatuyoc (Pachamarca)